Jan Zabystřan (born 26 January 1998) is a Czech alpine skier. He competed in the 2018 Winter Olympics.

World Cup results

Season standings

Results per discipline

Standings through 7 December 2020

World Championship results

Olympic results

Other results

European Cup results

Results per discipline

Standings through 7 December 2020

Far East Cup results

Season standings

Results per discipline

Standings through 7 December 2020

Race podiums
 4 win – (3 SL, 1 SG)
 12 podiums – (8 SL, 2 GS, 2 SG)

South American Cup results

Season standings

Results per discipline

Standings through 29 December 2019

Race podiums
 1 podium – (1 SL)

References

1998 births
Living people
Czech male alpine skiers
Alpine skiers at the 2018 Winter Olympics
Alpine skiers at the 2022 Winter Olympics
Olympic alpine skiers of the Czech Republic
Alpine skiers at the 2016 Winter Youth Olympics
Competitors at the 2019 Winter Universiade
Competitors at the 2023 Winter World University Games
Medalists at the 2023 Winter World University Games
People from Kadaň
Sportspeople from the Ústí nad Labem Region
21st-century Czech people
Universiade medalists in alpine skiing
Universiade gold medalists for the Czech Republic
Universiade bronze medalists for the Czech Republic